Kirkel is a municipality in the Saarpfalz district in Saarland, Germany. It is situated approximatively 8 km southeast of Neunkirchen, and 20 km east/northeast of Saarbrücken.

Overview
A rather well-preserved castle ruin is located a few hundred metres from the town centre. The small Kirkel castle was built in 1075 and is the town's landmark. Located on top of a small castle hill, and due to its large tower with 169 steps to the top, it can be seen from a great distance. Kirkel has the densest forest range in whole Saarland region.
It attracts many visitors due to its nice picturesque valleys and greenery over the hills.
Kirkel celebrates festivals more than any other place in the area. The most famous sight was the "Wurstmarkt" around August, which lasted for five days with a proper beer festival. As of 2014, no more Wurstmarkts are being held in Kirkel.

Attractions 
 Philippi Collection

References

External links

Burgsommer auf Burg Kirkel 
Castle Kirkel 

Castles in Saarland
Saarpfalz-Kreis
Palatinate (region)